State Road 566 (NM 566) is a  state highway in the US state of New Mexico. NM 566's southern terminus is at NM 118 and Historic U.S. Route 66 (Hist US 66) in Church Rock, and the northern terminus is at the end of state maintenance by Church Rock Mine.

Major intersections

See also

References

566
Transportation in McKinley County, New Mexico